Kombissiri is a city located in the province of Bazèga in Burkina Faso. It is the capital of Bazèga Province.

References 

Populated places in the Centre-Sud Region
Bazèga Province